Death Cruise is a 1974 American made-for-television mystery film starring Richard Long, Polly Bergen, Edward Albert, Kate Jackson, Celeste Holm, Tom Bosley, Michael Constantine and Cesare Danova. It was directed by Ralph Senensky and aired as the ABC Movie of the Week on October 30, 1974.

Plot
The Carters (Richard Long, Polly Bergen) and two other couples win tickets to a luxury Caribbean cruise. When each of the winners start turning up dead, it soon becomes apparent that the contest was just a trick to begin a killing game. It is up to the ship's doctor, Doctor Burke (Michael Constantine) to figure out what the connection between all these individuals are before more bodies start to turn up.

Cast
 Richard Long as Jerry Carter
 Polly Bergen as Sylvia Carter
 Edward Albert as James Radney
 Kate Jackson as Mary Frances Radney
 Celeste Holm as Elizabeth Mason
 Tom Bosley as David Mason
 Michael Constantine as Dr. Burke
 Cesare Danova as Captain Vettori
 Amzie Strickland as Lynn
 Alain Patrick as Barrere
 Maurice Sherbanee as Room Steward
 Wesley Gale as Hotel Clerk (as West Gale)
 Marc De Vries as Deck Steward

Production

See also
 List of American films of 1974

References

External links

1974 television films
1974 films
1970s mystery films
American mystery films
ABC Movie of the Week
Films produced by Aaron Spelling
Films set on ships
Films directed by Ralph Senensky
1970s American films